Simon Rakoff (born August 30, 1960) is a Canadian comedian who began performing professionally in 1978. A veteran of the Canadian comedy scene, he has performed in every province and is widely regarded as one of the quickest and cleverest Canadian stand-up comedians.  He has appeared on numerous Canadian television shows and festivals, including the Winnipeg Comedy Festival and Just for Laughs. He is also a frequent guest on CBC Radio on The Debaters and As It Happens. His comedy album Surrounded By Idiots was recorded and released in 2014.

He is the brother of humorist David Rakoff.

References

External links
 
 

Canadian people of Latvian-Jewish descent
Canadian people of Lithuanian-Jewish descent
Canadian stand-up comedians
Jewish Canadian comedians
Comedians from Toronto
Living people
1960 births